Ron Dean (born 29 September 1943) is a former  Australian rules footballer who played with Richmond in the Victorian Football League (VFL).

Notes

External links 

Living people
1943 births
Australian rules footballers from Victoria (Australia)
Richmond Football Club players